The 29th Pennsylvania House of Representatives District is in southeastern Pennsylvania and has been represented by Tim Brennan since 2023.

District profile 
The 29th Pennsylvania House of Representatives District is located in Bucks County and includes the following areas:

 Buckingham Township
Chalfont
Doylestown Township
New Britain
New Hope
Solebury Township

Representatives

Recent election results

References

External links 

 District map from the United States Census Bureau
 Pennsylvania House Legislative District Maps from the Pennsylvania Redistricting Commission.
 Population Data for District 29 from the Pennsylvania Redistricting Commission.

Government of Bucks County, Pennsylvania
29